Smashmouth was a band formed by guitarist Steve Pedersen, who was also in another band called Slowdown Virginia from Omaha, Nebraska at the time. He recruited bassist Bart Volkmer and drummer Clint Schnase. It was a trio that had grown out of a four-piece called Gravy Train that had originally included Ted Stevens, who had left the band when he moved to Lincoln, Nebraska to attend University of Nebraska–Lincoln (and form Polecat). Smashmouth was the first band to feature Pedersen's songwriting skills.

In 1995, both Smashmouth and Slowdown Virginia disbanded and formed what is now called Cursive. Pedersen left the band in 1998, to form The White Octave and finally, Criteria.

Band members
Steve Pedersen
Bart Volkmer
Clint Schnase

Discography
Some of You Will Be Hermits (1995 · Lumberjack Records)

See also
Criteria
Cursive
Slowdown Virginia
The White Octave

References

External links
Saddle Creek Records

Indie rock musical groups from Nebraska